This was the first edition of the event.

Jiří Veselý won the title, defeating Federico Delbonis in the final, 6–7(2–7), 7–6(9–7), 6–4.

Seeds

Draw

Finals

Top half

Bottom half

References
 Main Draw
 Qualifying Draw

Singles
Svijany Open singles